Souleymane Diaby may refer to:

 Souleymane Diaby (footballer, born 1987), Ivorian former football striker
 Souleymane Diaby (footballer, born 1999), Ivorian football left-back for Winterthur